Ivan Tsankov (born 26 March 1984) is a Bulgarian football player, who last played for Nesebar as a midfielder.

References

1984 births
Living people
Bulgarian footballers
Second Professional Football League (Bulgaria) players
FC Chernomorets Balchik players
PFC Chernomorets Burgas players
FC Pomorie players
PFC Nesebar players

Association football midfielders